Prabhudas Khushaldas Patel was an Indian independence activist, politician, administrator, agriculturist and a pioneer of the cooperative movement in India.  He was the Deputy Minister of Agriculture and Irrigation in the Government of India and a Member of Parliament (Lok Sabha) from Dabhoi in Gujarat.

Early life and work as an independence activist
Patel was born in 1914 in Alindra, Kheda district, Bombay Presidency to an agriculturist family. He completed his inter-arts education from Baroda College (now the Maharaja Sayajirao University of Baroda).

Politician, Parliamentarian and Union Minister 

Patel was a member of the Indian National Congress and, in 1947-48, was appointed as the first secretary of the Baroda District Congress Committee.  He played an active role in district, state and eventually national level politics. He resigned from the Indian National Congress due to certain internal differences and joined the Swatantra Party for a brief period.  However, after the split of the Indian National Congress in 1969, Patel joined the Indian National Congress (R) (later Indian National Congress (I)).  

Patel was elected to the 5th Lok Sabha from Dabhoi in Gujarat in 1971.  In October 1974, he was appointed Deputy Minister of Agriculture and Irrigation in the Government of India headed by Indira Gandhi.  However, he resigned from this position and the primary membership of the Indian National Congress (I) in 1977 to protest the Indian Emergency and the internal workings of the party.  He was thereafter associated the Janata Party, a party primarily formed to oppose the Indian Emergency, and contested the 1980 Lok Sabha elections from Baroda against the Indian National Congress, which he lost.

Personal life
Patel was married to Smt. Savitaben Patel and has two sons and one daughter.

References 

1914 births
Year of death missing